Maria Callani (15 August 1778 – 9 February 1803) was an Italian portrait painter, active in the 18th century in Milan and Parma, Italy.

Biography 

Maria Callani was born 15 August 1778 in Milan, Italy, her father was artist Gaetano Callani and her mother was Angela Gerli, the sister of the architect :it:Agostino Gerli. Her younger brother Francesco Callani (1779–1844) was also a portrait painter.

Her portraits included notable figures like the Countess Chiara Mazzucchini Guidoboni of Viadana, Alessandro Sanvitale, :it:Stefano Sanvitale, and Fra Antonio Negroni,. 

Callani died at the age of 24 of tuberculosis on 9 February 1803 in Parma. Her works can be found in various public museum collections including Galleria nazionale di Parma, Museo Glauco Lombardi, :it:Pinacoteca Stuard, among others.

References 

1778 births
1803 deaths
Italian portrait painters
Artists from Parma
Artists from Milan
Tuberculosis deaths in Italy
18th-century Italian painters
18th-century Italian women artists
19th-century Italian painters
19th-century Italian women artists
19th-century deaths from tuberculosis
Infectious disease deaths in Emilia-Romagna
Sibling artists
Italian women painters